West Virginia Route 34 is a north–south state highway in the U.S. state of West Virginia. The southern terminus of the route is at West Virginia Route 3 three miles (5 km) east of Hamlin. The northern terminus is at Interstate 77 exit 124 in Kenna.

The portion of the highway between Scott Depot and Hurricane has seen heavy commercial and residential development since the 1980s. The area, known as Teays Valley, has grown into a major suburb of Charleston, the state's capital.

Major intersections

West Virginia Route 34 Business
WV 34 Bus is a business loop through downtown Hurricane.  It follows Main Street from US 60 southwest of Hurricane northeastward to WV 34 just east of downtown Hurricane. Along WV 34 and US 60, it is signed as WV 34 Alternate, but along the route itself, it is signed as WV 34 Business.

References

034
Transportation in Lincoln County, West Virginia
Transportation in Putnam County, West Virginia
Transportation in Jackson County, West Virginia
Transportation in Kanawha County, West Virginia